Childer Thornton is a village on the Wirral Peninsula, in the unitary authority Cheshire West and Chester and the ceremonial county of Cheshire, England. It was once a separate village but has since been incorporated into Ellesmere Port. Childer Thornton is on the A41 trunk road, between Hooton and Little Sutton.

History
The name Childer Thornton means "children's thorn-tree farm/settlement" and likely derives from the Old English words cild (children), þorn (hawthorn tree) and tūn (a farmstead or settlement).

Although not specifically mentioned in the Domesday Book of 1086, it constituted a portion of the land owned by St Werburgh's Abbey in Chester.

Childer Thornton was once within the parish of Eastham in the Wirral Hundred, becoming a separate civil parish in 1866. It was administered as part of Wirral Rural District until 1933 when it was transferred to Ellesmere Port Urban District. The civil parish was abolished in 1950 and the area subsumed into Ellesmere Port.  
The population was 112 in 1801, 319 in 1851 and rising to 685 by 1901.

Geography
Childer Thornton is in the southern part of the Wirral Peninsula, near to the town of Ellesmere Port.

Community and Economy
The village has one school, three pubs, a hotel and a garden centre. Childer Thornton is exactly halfway in distance between Birkenhead and Chester and one of the pubs is named 'The Halfway House', which was a stagecoach stop between Chester and New Ferry in the 1770s. Childer Thornton's other pubs are 'The Burleydam' and 'The White Lion'. The Village Petrol Station is equipped with a charging station for electric vehicles.

Religion
Childer Thornton is in the Anglican parish of Hooton, with an attractive parish church made of local sandstone, situated just outside the village itself. St Paul's Church was built between 1858 and 1862, at a cost of £5,000.  It was designated a Grade II* listed building in 1985.

Transport

The busy A41 road between Birkenhead and Chester runs through the middle of Childer Thornton. Despite this, the area is relatively unspoilt, with the M53 motorway effectively diverting away from the bulk of through traffic. To the north of the village, the A550 road diverges from the A41, heading towards North Wales.  

The nearest railway station is Little Sutton, on the Wirral line of the Merseyrail network between Ellesmere Port and Liverpool.

The village is however served by frequent bus services (as of 2021):

References

Villages in Cheshire
Areas of Ellesmere Port